John Higginson (fl. 1561–1622) was one of the eight founding fellows of Jesus College, Oxford in 1571. He matriculated from Trinity College, Cambridge in 1561, obtaining his BA degree in 1565 and his MA in 1568.  He was appointed vicar of Claybrooke, Leicestershire, England in 1571 and ordained priest in 1572. He was still alive at the time of the grant to Jesus College of its third charter by King James I in 1622.

References

Alumni of Trinity College, Cambridge
Fellows of Jesus College, Oxford
16th-century births
Year of death unknown
16th-century English educators
17th-century English people
17th-century English Anglican priests
16th-century English Anglican priests